Appleton International Airport , formerly Outagamie County Regional Airport, is an airport located in Greenville, Wisconsin, United States,  west of Appleton. It is included in the Federal Aviation Administration (FAA) National Plan of Integrated Airport Systems for 2023–2027. Along with Madison’s Dane County Regional Airport, it is one of two airports in the State of Wisconsin categorized as a small hub.

It is the third busiest of eight commercial airports in Wisconsin in terms of passengers served. In 2016 the airport contributed $676 million to the Northeastern Wisconsin economy. In May 2018, Appleton International Airport was the fourth fastest growing airport in the US. It is the main base of privately owned regional airline Air Wisconsin and was the original home of Midwest Airlines. Midwest Airlines grew out of Kimberly-Clark subsidiary K-C Aviation, which was sold in 1998 to Gulfstream Aerospace, which retains a major facility at the airport, focusing on maintenance and interior completions for the companies G600, G650, and G700 products.

The airport attracts people heading back and forth between the EAA's AirVenture, Air Academy and other programs in nearby Oshkosh. Starting in 2017, the airport began to offer camping for AirVenture. Appleton International is also used for people heading to events at Lambeau Field in nearby Green Bay, most popularly Green Bay Packers games.

History
The airport opened with the  runway 12/30 around 1965.

In the 1920s, Appleton's airport was George A. Whiting Field, three miles (5 km) south of town. When Northwest was awarded Contract Airmail Route No. 9 in 1926, Whiting Field became one of the original six airports in the airline's route network. Passenger service on Northwest began in 1927 but was short-lived. By 1936 the municipal airport had opened northeast of town on the south side of US 41, southeast of the intersection. At its closing, it had a  paved runway; North Central DC-3s landed there after 1958–59.

Construction of the current facility began in 1963; the field was dedicated on August 22, 1965, along with Air Wisconsin, which started operations out of the airport the next day.

Recent years
Since 2009, the airport has been completing a number of renovation projects under a PFC plan. Parts of the project already completed include rehabilitating runway 12/30 and taxiway B as well as expanding taxiway N and installing runway guard lights throughout the field. In January 2017, a new rental car facility opened across from the terminal building.

In December 2017, the airport started a project to remodel the terminal with the addition of meeting space, a brand new restaurant with airfield views, remodeled/expanded security area, and remodeled check-in area.

Furthermore the airport is currently studying the construction of adding additional gates either through expanding the airport's current concourse or building a second concourse.

In 2011, the airport was one of ten nationwide airports selected to participate in an FAA airport sustainability project with a goal to make the airport 70% more energy efficient by 2030. In 2017, the airport constructed solar carports (covered parking structure with solar panels on the roof) in the short-term parking lot. Additional solar carports were constructed and completed in October 2019. The solar carports supplement a system of solar panels installed on the roof of the terminal building which were installed in the early 2010s.

The Appleton Flight Center Terminal, which was constructed in 2013, is a LEED-certified facility and features zero VOC finishes, a roof-mounted 26 kW photovoltaic system, a ground source heat pump, in-floor radiant conditioning, and a rainwater collection system. The terminal was the nation’s first airport terminal to achieve a net zero energy designation, receiving a Class D Net Zero Energy Building rating and is widely considered to be a leader in airport energy sustainability.

In the late 2010s, the airport saw a period of mass growth. In May 2018 a report by Bloomberg News revealed that Appleton International Airport was the fourth fastest-growing airport in the US, with a 26.8% increase in passengers compared to two years prior.

This expansion was the result of the introduction of American Airlines and an increase in flights from Air Wisconsin flying under the United Express brand. New routes like Denver and Punta Gorda, an upgrade in the size of aircraft being utilized by airlines, and cheaper airfare also contributed towards the large growth.

The Outagamie County Board rejected a proposal in 1983 to change the name to "Fox Cities Metro Airport," and three more name change efforts failed between 2003 and 2011. In February 2014, the county board voted to rename the airport "Appleton International Airport." The new name was officially implemented in 2015 on August 21, during the golden anniversary celebration of the airport.

In 2019, the airport handled just over 762,000 passengers, the most in its history.

On August 10, 2021, Allegiant Air announced that they would base Airbus A320 aircraft at the airport beginning March 2, 2022. They will also open a crew/maintenance base to support these aircraft.

In February 2023, there were 74 aircraft based at this airport: 50 single-engine, 17 multi-engine and 7 jets.

Facilities

Runways

Appleton International Airport has 2 runways that are perpendicular to one another forming an X shape. All taxiways are equipped with LED taxiway edge lighting and all entrances to runways have runway guard lights.

Terminal
The terminal was built in 1974, with expansions in 1983, 1990, and 1998. 

The airport added a new ground-level seven-gate concourse in 2000 and renovated the existing passenger terminal, which was designed by architect Paul W. Powers. The architectural theme was representative of the river flowing through the historic paper manufacturing region.

The terminal underwent its most extensive renovation and expansion to date in 2001. The new  gate area included more spacious seating areas with natural lighting, in floor heating, new passenger paging system, and five aircraft boarding bridges; a 6th bridge for larger planes was added later. It cost $10.7 million and was designed by Mead & Hunt, Inc.

The airport's main entrance at CTH CA features a complete reproduction of the Apollo 11 statue located in the Moon Tree Garden of the Kennedy Space Center Visitor Complex. It was donated to the airport in 2020 by local car salesmen giant John Bergstrom.

The terminal has eight gates currently in use: seven with jet bridges–which are numbered 3 through 7, 7b, and 8–and one for tarmac entry, numbered 8b. Gates 1 and 2 are not frequently used due to their close proximity to the main terminal building and the resulting difficulty maneuvering aircraft in those tight spaces. The layout can best be explained by looking at the terminal map.

Ground transportation

Valley Transit bus service does not have a stop servicing the airport, but there are stops nearby.

Vehicle for hire companies including Uber, Lyft, and taxicabs are allowed to pick up and drop off passengers on airport property.

Six car rental companies offer service at the airport out of a consolidated rental car facility across from the terminal.

Other
The airport has an FBO, Appleton Flight Center, which offers AvGas and Jet Fuel, as well as a number of other resources such as a crew car and WiFi.

ATW holds the Old Glory Honor Flights for the Northeast Wisconsin area. These flights bring veterans from World War II and the Korean war to see their memorials in Washington. The airport has hosted many community events to raise money for these flights, including a plane pull event in September 2017. The flights are flown by Sun Country Airlines.

The airport, along with Allegiant Air, hosts a bi-annual event called "Wings for Autism". The event allows children on the autism spectrum, along with their parents, to go through a rehearsal flight in which they practice checking in for their flight, going through airport security, boarding their flight, and collecting checked baggage. The event is sponsored by many local organizations and companies. It is one of the largest versions of the event held nationally.

Every April, the airport celebrates autism awareness month by lighting the terminal blue.

The airport is home to the Fox Cities Composite Squadron of the Civil Air Patrol, which houses a fleet of Cessna 182s at the airport.

Airlines and destinations

Passenger

Cargo operations

Statistics

Carrier shares

Top destinations

Annual traffic

For the twelve-month period ending December 31, 2021, the airport had 42,697 aircraft operations, an average of 117 per day: 60% general aviation, 28% air taxi, 11% commercial airline and less than 1% military.

Accidents and incidents
 On , Air Wisconsin Flight 671, a DHC-6 Twin Otter, collided with North Central Airlines Flight 290 over Lake Winnebago while on approach to the airport; both planes crashed into the lake and sank, resulting in 13 fatalities.
On February 14, 2011, a Gulfstream G550 overran runway 30 at Appleton after the aircraft had reportedly lost its hydraulic system. The aircraft was operating a test flight after a new interior was installed and before being delivered to a new owner. All three people on board survived.
 On , a chartered Delta Air Lines Airbus A330 (N802NW) carrying an NFL team, the Minnesota Vikings, slid off a taxiway after landing, stranding the team on board for four hours before they were rescued using fire ladders.
On August 13, 2022, a Delta Air Lines Boeing 717 encountered a bald eagle strike on takeoff from Appleton.

See also
 List of airports in Wisconsin
 List of intercity bus stops in Wisconsin
 Valley Transit

References

External links

 
  from the Wisconsin DOT Airport Directory
 
 

Airports in Wisconsin
Buildings and structures in Outagamie County, Wisconsin
Transportation in Outagamie County, Wisconsin
1965 establishments in Wisconsin